The Revolutionary Black Panther Party or RBPP is a revolutionary organization, advocating for black nationalism. The Revolutionary Black Panther Party, claims continuity of the Black Panther Party of the 1960s, as their leader Alli Muhammad (Chief-General-In-Command), was raised a member. In 1992 the RBPP was officially named and has been carrying on with its started aims of "protecting and defending our people against genocide, ethnic cleansing, crimes against humanity, the Black African Holocaust  and race war waged against people of African descent."

The RBPP is designated as a hate group by the Southern Poverty Law Center (SPLC).

History 
The RBPP considers itself, the "same" Black Panther Party of the 1960s just dealing with today's standards of war, warfare, suffering and oppression. According to Muhammad, "Growing up a Panther cub …there are things engrained in you, that you can never get out of you, and it matures you, it is difficult to erase this maturity and as a fully grown panther, it lives on in the Revolution, in the Revolutionary Black Panther Party…".

Marches in St. Louis

The RBPP launched what they call the "Armed Black Human Rights Movement" and "Armed Freedom Rides" and did an "Armed Human Rights March" with machetes and rifles through the Central West End (white community) of St. Louis, Missouri, for what according to Alli Muhammad, was "in honor of the humanity" of Black victims such as Michael Brown., Alton Sterling, Angelo Brown and Darren Seals.

Demonstrations in Milwaukee 

In 2016, RBPP marched in Milwaukee, Wisconsin, armed with guns, to protest to what they referred to as "genocide" of African Americans at the hands of law enforcement. The RBPP called for the resignation of Milwaukee Mayor Tom Barrett and Police Chief Ed Flynn. Some members chanted  "fuck the pigs" and "free us or you die, cracker!".

References

1992 establishments in the United States
Activists for African-American civil rights
African-American socialism
Black Panther Party
Black political parties in the United States
Far-left politics in the United States
Marxist parties in the United States
Political parties established in 1992